The 1990 Scott Tournament of Hearts, the Canadian women's national curling championship, was held from February 24 to March 3, 1990 at the Ottawa Civic Centre in Ottawa, Ontario. The total attendance for the week was 29,042.

Team Ontario, who was skipped by Alison Goring won the event on home soil as they beat Nova Scotia in the final 7–5. Ontario advanced to the final after defeating two-time champion Heather Houston and Team Canada 8–3 in the semifinal. This was the third time that Ontario had won the event and the fourth time in the last five years that a rink from Ontario had won. The Goring rink would go onto represent Canada in the 1990 World Women's Curling Championship held in Västerås, Sweden where they lost in the semifinal to eventual champion Norway.

New Brunswick's 11–0 victory over Alberta in Draw 5 was the sixth shutout record in tournament history and the first time ever where there were shutouts recorded in back-to-back tournaments.

Teams
The teams were listed as follows:

Round Robin standings
Final Round Robin standings

Round Robin results
All draw times are listed in Eastern Standard Time (UTC-05:00).

Draw 1
Saturday, February 24, 2:00 pm

Draw 2
Saturday, February 24, 7:30 pm

Draw 3
Sunday, February 25, 2:00 pm

Draw 4
Sunday, February 25, 7:30 pm

Draw 5
Monday, February 26, 9:00 am

Draw 6
Monday, February 26, 2:00 pm

Draw 7
Monday, February 26, 7:30 pm

Draw 8
Tuesday, February 27, 9:00 am

Draw 9
Tuesday, February 27, 2:00 pm

Draw 10
Tuesday, February 27, 7:30 pm

Draw 11
Wednesday, February 28, 9:00 am

Draw 12
Wednesday, February 28, 2:00 pm

Draw 13
Wednesday, February 28, 7:30 pm

Draw 14
Thursday, March 1, 2:00 pm

Draw 15
Thursday, March 1, 7:30 pm

Playoffs

Semifinal
Friday, March 2, 7:30 pm

Final
Saturday, March 3, 2:00 pm

Statistics

Top 5 player percentages
Final Round Robin Percentages

Awards
The all-star team and sportsmanship award winners were as follows:

All-Star Team

Lee Tobin Award 
The Scotties Tournament of Hearts Sportsmanship Award is presented to the curler who best embodies the spirit of curling at the Scotties Tournament of Hearts. The winner was selected in a vote by all players at the tournament. 

Prior to 1998, the award was named after a notable individual in the curling community where the tournament was held that year. For this edition, the award was named after Lee Tobin. Tobin, known as "Little Mouse" skipped in four women's national championships for Quebec and won the  championship, which to date is Quebec's only women's championship. Tobin was inducted into the Canadian Curling Hall of Fame in 1979.

Notes

References

Scotties Tournament of Hearts
Scott Tournament of Hearts
Curling in Ottawa
1990 in Ontario
1990 in women's curling
1990s in Ottawa
February 1990 sports events in Canada
March 1990 sports events in Canada